Hi-Fi News & Record Review is a British monthly magazine, published by AV Tech Media Ltd, which reviews audiophile-oriented sound-reproduction and recording equipment, and includes information on new products and developments in audio.

It is the oldest hi-fi title in the world, having been in publication since 1956. Gramophone, "the world's authority on classical music since 1923", might dispute this. Equipment reviews did begin later.

As well as hardware, there are also reviews of Super Audio CD titles, and more recently, FLAC downloads.

References

External links

Lifestyle magazines published in the United Kingdom
Music magazines published in the United Kingdom
Science and technology magazines published in the United Kingdom
Magazines established in 1956